Nethradhama Superspeciality Eye Hospital, located in Jayanagar near Yediyur Lake is an eye hospital offering eye care facilities in Bangalore, India.

History 
It was started as a clinic in 1994 by Dr. Sri Ganesh an Ophthalmologist. Nethradhama has grown into a Superspeciality eye hospital and a Post graduate Institute of Ophthalmology.

References

External links 
 

Hospitals in Bangalore
Eye care in India
Hospitals established in 1994
1994 establishments in Karnataka